Straight Checkn 'Em is the second studio album by American gangsta rap group Compton's Most Wanted. It was released on July 16, 1991 through Orpheus Records and Epic Records. Recording sessions took place at Big Beat Soundlabs in Los Angeles from April 2 to April 19, 1991, except for the song "Growin' Up in the Hood" recorded and mixed at Trax Recording Studio in Hollywood on March 31, 1991. Production was handled entirely by DJ Slip and The Unknown DJ.

The album spawned three singles: "Growin' Up in the Hood", "Straight Checkn 'Em" and "Compton's Lynchin'"/"They Still Gafflin'". Its lead single, "Growin' Up in the Hood", made it to #1 on the Hot Rap Songs chart and was featured in 1991 film Boyz n the Hood and the film's soundtrack. The second single, a title track "Straight Checkn 'Em", peaked at #16 on the same Billboard chart. Along with the singles, music videos were directed for the songs "Growin' Up in the Hood" and "Straight Checkn 'Em".

The album peaked at number 92 on the Billboard 200 and at number 23 on the Top R&B/Hip-Hop Albums chart in the United States.

Tha Chill was unable to appear in this album because he was sentenced to prison some months before the recording, the only song he was able to appear was "Growin' Up in the Hood".

Track listing

Personnel
Aaron Tyler – lyrics, vocals
Terry Keith Allen – drum programming, scratches, producer, arranger
Michael Bryant – scratches
Andre Manuel – drum programming, producer, arranger, recording, mixing, executive producer
William Fredric Zimmerman – piano (track 8)
Mike "Webeboomindashit" Edwards – recording, mixing
Brian Gardner – mastering
David Provost – photography

Charts

References

External links 

1991 albums
Compton's Most Wanted albums
Epic Records albums